State Correctional Institution – Houtzdale is a 1500-bed correctional facility located outside Houtzdale in southern Clearfield County, Pennsylvania, along Pennsylvania Route 153.

Building SCI Houtzdale
The facility cost $70 Million to construct and, when opened in January 1996, had a bed capacity of 1,587. As of June 2012 SCI Houtzdale is the third-largest correctional institution in the state of Pennsylviania holding upwards of 2,800 inmates.

Notable inmates
 Warren McGlone (alias Steady B) - Hip hop artist, convicted in the murder of Philadelphia Police Department officer Lauretha Vaird in a bank robbery

See also
List of Pennsylvania state prisons

References

Prisons in Pennsylvania
Buildings and structures in Clearfield County, Pennsylvania
1996  establishments in Pennsylvania